Zhao Yusong (December 26, 1897 – November 18, 1971) was a journalist and politician of the Republic of China. He was born in Guizhou. He served as in the collaborationist government of Wang Jingwei in Nanjing. After the downfall of Wang's government in August 1945, Zhao fled to Hong Kong. He died in Tokyo, Japan.

References

Bibliography
 
 
 
 

1897 births
1971 deaths
Republic of China politicians from Guizhou
Republic of China journalists
Chinese collaborators with Imperial Japan
Chinese exiles
Writers from Guizhou